El cucuy may refer to:
 "El Cucuy", an episode of the US television series, Grimm.
 An alternate spelling of el coco, a mythical creature.
 Renán Almendárez Coello, host of El Cucuy de la mañana, also known by this name.
 Tony Ferguson, a UFC fighter who uses it as his nickname.

See also
El Cocuy National Park